...smile's OK is a 1998 album by The Hope Blister.

Track listing
"Dagger" (Neil Halstead)
"Only Human" (Heidi Berry)
"Outer Skin" (Chris Knox)
"Sweet Unknown" (A. Shaw)
"Let the Happiness In" (David Sylvian)
"Is Jesus Your Pal" (Slowblow)
"Spider and I" (Brian Eno)
"Hanky Panky Nohow" (John Cale)

Personnel
Louise Rutkowski – vocals
Laurence O'Keefe – bass guitar
Audrey Riley – cello
Chris Tombling – violin
Leo Payne – violin
Sue Dench – viola
Richard Thomas – saxophone, drums
Audrey Riley – string arrangements
Louise Laurence, Dmitri Willilams and Astrid Williamson – backing vocals
Sheena Bizarre- Chatter and layered vocal
Ivo Watts-Russell – producer
John Fryer – mixing

References

The Hope Blister albums
1998 debut albums
4AD albums
Covers albums